The Sanjak of Monastir or Manastir or Bitola, was a sanjak within the Rumelia Eyalet (1465–1867) and then the Manastir Vilayet (1874–1912). The administrative seat was in Manastir (Bitola).

Sub-districts

1880
The sub-districts, kaza, of the Sanjak of Manastir included (in 1880):
Bitola
Florina
Kičevo
Prilep
Ohrid

And the mudurluk of:
Prespa
Resen
Ekşisu
Mariovo

–1908
The sub-districts, kaza, of the Sanjak of Manastir included (before 1908):
Monastir (Bitola)
Pirlepe (Prilep)
Florina
Kıraçova (Kičevo)
Ohrid

Demographics

1897
According to Russian consul in the Manastir Vilayet, A. Rostkovski, finishing the statistical article in 1897, the total population of the sanjak was 308,996, with Rostkovski grouping the population into the following groups:

Slavic Exarchists: 151,863
Slavic Patriarchists: 51,749
Slavic Muslims: 8,251
Albanian Muslims: 45,259
Albanian Christians: 723
Vlachs (Aromanians and Megleno-Romanians): 22,681
Turks, Ottomans: 24,923
Jews: 4,270

Ottoman censuses
According to the 1881–1882 and the 1905–1906 census of the Ottoman Empire, the population of the Sanjak of Manastir is distributed, as follows:

References

Monastir
Macedonia under the Ottoman Empire
15th-century establishments in the Ottoman Empire
1912 disestablishments in the Ottoman Empire